Problematic is the eighth studio album by American hardcore punk band All. It was recorded at the band's own recording studio, The Blasting Room in Fort Collins, Colorado, and released on Epitaph Records in 2000.

Track listing

Credits
ALL
Chad Price – Vocals
Bill Stevenson – Drums
Karl Alvarez – Bass guitar, vocals
Stephen Egerton – Guitar

Production
 Bill Stevenson – Producer, engineer, mixing
 Jason Livermore – Producer, engineer, mastering, mixing
 Stephen Egerton –Producer, engineer

Artwork
Chris Shary  – Cover Art

References

External links

Problematic at YouTube (streamed copy where licensed)

All (band) albums
2000 albums
Epitaph Records albums
Albums produced by Bill Stevenson (musician)